Love Story is a 60-minute UK anthology television series produced by Associated Television (ATV). 128 episodes aired on ITV (TV network) from 1963–1974.

Its guest stars included Vanessa Redgrave, Lynn Redgrave, Dudley Moore, Wendy Hiller, Malcolm McDowell, Patrick Macnee, John Hurt, Geoffrey Palmer, Judy Cornwell, Leo McKern, David Hemmings, Judy Parfitt, Anna Massey, Felicity Kendal, Edward Fox, Sam Wanamaker, Ian McShane, Michael Kitchen, George Maharis and Margaret Whiting.

References

External links

1960s British drama television series
1970s British drama television series
1963 British television series debuts
1974 British television series endings
Television shows produced by Associated Television (ATV)
English-language television shows
Television shows shot at ATV Elstree Studios